Libertia peregrinans  is a flowering plant in the family Iridaceae. The species is native to New Zealand.

Cultivation
Libertia peregrinans is cultivated in the horticulture trade and widely available as an ornamental plant for gardens.

References

External links

peregrinans
Flora of New Zealand
Garden plants of New Zealand
Taxa named by Harry Allan